Diversity debt is a term coined in the first half of the 2010s, and leveraged by companies as one metric contributing to gender pay gap analyses. UK-based bank Monzo were the first to publicise this widely; their case has been cited in evaluations of the metric and its accompanying philosophy.

Theory 
As with any more traditional/tangible financial debt, "DD" is first incurred at the founding or incorporation of a company or firm. It is based on how statistically unrepresentative the company may be, of some sample population (typically the population of the country in which the company is first established) and fluctuates with incremental changes in the workforce: 
 hiring a member of some under-represented minority population (e.g. with regard to gender and/or ethnicitiy) will tend to decrease ("pay off") the debt.
 hiring more members of any already-over-represented majority will tend to increase the debt.

For example, a company established by 2x co-founders of the same gender & race automatically starts with some debt since no country is entirely uniform in gender & ethnicity; at the hiring of a 3rd team member "DD" can be used as one metric to determine the impact of the hire upon the diversity represented in the workforce.

The metric is open to controversial interpretation & application in many jurisdictions where the consideration of a candidate's gender and/or race is explicitly outlawed, for example in the United States where some affirmative action policies are encouraged, but others penalised in federal law.

In popular culture 
A TEDx talk on the topic was delivered by Sarah Saska in 2017.

Monzo has stopped using the term in its public discussions around diversity & inclusion.

References 

Gender pay gap
2010s neologisms